P48 or P.48 may refer to:

Aircraft 
 Douglas XP-48, a cancelled American fighter aircraft
 Partenavia P.48 Astore, an Italian prototype light aircraft
 Percival P.48 Merganser, a British civil utility aircraft

Other uses 
 BMW P48 Turbo engine, an automobile engine
 BRM P48, a Formula One racing car
 , a P-class sloop of the Royal Navy
 , a submarine of the Royal Navy
 Papyrus 48 or P48, an early copy of a part of the New Testament in Greek
 Pleasant Valley Airport, in Maricopa County, Arizona, United States
 PTF1A, pancreas transcription factor 1 subunit alpha
 P48, a Latvian state regional road
 P48, a phantom power standard